Almost Cured of Sadness is a 2003 album by British singer-songwriter Stephen Jones.

Track listing

References

External links
 Almost Cured of Sadness official download page on Bandcamp.

2003 albums
Sanctuary Records albums